The Kyushu bitterling (Rhodeus atremius)  is a temperate freshwater fish belonging to the Acheilognathinae of the family Cyprinidae. It originates on Kyushu Island in Japan. It was originally described as Acanthorhodeus atremius by Jordan & Thompson in 1914.

When spawning, the females deposit their eggs inside bivalves, where they hatch and the young remain until they can swim.

There are two currently recognised subspecies, Rhodeus atremius atremius and R. a. suigensis.

References 

Kyushu bitterling
Kyushu region
Kyushu bitterling
Taxa named by David Starr Jordan